Pinhas Minkowsky (April 5, 1859 – January 18, 1924) was a Russian hazzan and composer.

Biography
Phinehas Minkovsky was born in Bila Tserkva in April 1859. His father, Mordecai, a descendant of Yom-Tov Lipmann Heller, was cantor in the city's Great Synagogue, and he himself was a singer in his father's choir.

After having studied the Tanakh and Talmud under different teachers, Minkovsky continued his Talmudical studies alone in the bet hamidrash of his native town. At the age of eighteen he began to study Russian and German, and he mastered these two languages.

Minkovsky thereafter went to Vienna, where he continued his studies under Robert Fuchs, from whom he obtained a diploma as singer. He was afterwards successively cantor in Kherson and Lemberg. In 1881 he became cantor in Odessa (in the great synagogue), but soon departed for New York to work at the Kahal Adath Jeshurun synagogue. In 1892 he was called back to Odessa, where he served as cantor of the Broder Synagogue for thirty years until its closure by the Bolsheviks in 1922.

He returned to the United States in August 1923, dying there the following year at the age of 65. Over 1,000 people attended his memorial service on the Lower East Side, which included performances by Yossele Rosenblatt and other well-known cantors.

Partial bibliography

References
 

1859 births
1924 deaths
19th-century Jews from the Russian Empire
20th-century Russian Jews
20th-century Ukrainian Jews
Composers from the Russian Empire
Hazzans
Jewish composers
Jews from the Russian Empire
Odesa Jews
People from Bila Tserkva
Reform Jews
Reform Zionists
Russian male composers
Russian tenors
Soviet emigrants to the United States
Ukrainian composers
Ukrainian tenors
Zionists from the Russian Empire